The Zaccaria family was an ancient and noble Genoese dynasty.

Zaccaria may also refer to:

Given name
 Zaccaria Boveri or Boverius (1568–1638), Italian jurist and Capuchin Friar Minor
 Zaccaria Cometti (1937–2020), Italian footballer
 Zaccaria Delfino (1527–1584), Italian Roman Catholic cardinal, and bishop in modern-day Croatia
 Zaccaria della Vecchia (died 1625), Roman Catholic prelate, bishop of Torcello
 Zaccaria Giovanni Divanic (died 1562), Roman Catholic prelate, bishop of Pedena, Croatia
 Zaccaria Giacometti (1893–1970), Swiss professor of constitutional law
 Zaccaria de Moris (died 1517), Roman Catholic prelate, bishop of Terracina

Surname
 Andronikos Asen Zaccaria (died 1401), Frankish lord of Achaea
 Anthony Zaccaria (1502–1539), leader of the Counter-Reformation
 Bartolomeo Zaccaria (died 1334), Marquess of Bodonitsa
 Benedetto I Zaccaria (c. 1235–1307), admiral of the Republic of Genoa
 Benedetto II Zaccaria (died 1330), co-Lord of Chios and other Aegean islands
 Catherine Zaccaria or Catherine Palaiologina (died 1462), daughter of the last Prince of Achaea, Centurione II
 Centurione I Zaccaria (1336–1376), noble in Achaea
 Centurione II Zaccaria (died 1432), Prince of Achaea
 Francesco Antonio Zaccaria (1714–1795), Italian theologian, historian, and writer
 Giuseppe Zaccaria (1930–1985), known as Pino Zac, Italian illustrator, cartoonist and animator
 John Asen Zaccaria (died 1469), son of the last Prince of Achaea, Centurione II
 Manuele Zaccaria (died 1287/88), Genoese lord of Phocaea
 Maria II Zaccaria (fl. 1404), Princess of Achaia
 Martino Zaccaria, Lord of Chios 1314–1329, ruler of several Aegean islands
 Nicola Zaccaria (1923–2007), Greek bass
 Paleologo Zaccaria (died 1314), Lord of Chios and Phocaea and other Aegean islands
 Stephen Zaccaria, Latin Archbishop of Patras from 1404
 Tedisio Zaccaria, lord of Thasos, governor of Phocaea 1302–1307

Other uses
 Zaccaria (company), an Italian pinball and arcade machine manufacturer
 San Zaccaria, Venice, a 15th-century former monastic church

See also
 Zechariah (disambiguation)
 Zacharias (surname)